Discula lyelliana is a species of air-breathing land snail, a terrestrial pulmonate gastropod mollusk in the family Geomitridae.

Discula lyelliana was listed as Critically endangered possibly extinct in the 2011 IUCN Red List, before it was rediscovered, and is now part of a breeding and reintroduction programme.

Distribustion 
This species is endemic to Deserta Grande Island, Madeira.

References

Molluscs of Madeira
Discula
Taxa named by Richard Thomas Lowe
Gastropods described in 1852
Taxonomy articles created by Polbot